The Midhurst transmitting station is a facility for both analogue and digital VHF/FM radio and UHF television transmission,  northeast of Midhurst, West Sussex, England. The station broadcasts to much of the northern half of West Sussex, and to small parts of Surrey and Hampshire.

The transmission site is located at 51° 01' 2.0″ North, 0° 42' 4.0" West (National Grid Reference: SU912250).

The current mast has an average height of 307 metres above sea level. It is now owned and operated by Arqiva, but was owned by the BBC before they privatised their transmission department prior to 1997.

Services listed by frequency

Analogue radio (FM VHF)

Digital radio (DAB)

Television

Analogue

1972 – 1983

1983 – 31 December 1992

1 January 1993 – 14 November 1998

Analogue and digital

15 November 1998 – 28 February 2012
Digital terrestrial television was first transmitted from the Midhurst mast from 15 November 1998 using the frequency gaps between the analogue TV broadcasts. To limit interference to the analogue transmissions, power output on the digital multiplexes was low.

29 February 2012 to 13 March 2012

On 29 February 2012, Midhurst started DSO with analogue BBC2 ceasing transmission on UHF 55 and Mux 1 closed on UHF 56. The new BBC A multiplex started on UHF 55 from the start.

Digital

14 March 2012 to 2 October 2012 

Following the completion of analogue TV shutdown on 14 March 2012, Midhurst frequency allocation was.

3 October 2012 to 20 March 2018

Due to the clearance of the 800 MHz band, Digital 3&4 was moved from UHF 61 to UHF 56 and SDN from UHF 62 to UHF 54.

21 March 2018 to 15 October 2019
Due to the clearance of the 700 MHz band, SDN was moved from UHF 54 to UHF 29, this allowed Digital 3&4 to move from UHF 56 to UHF 54 (this was a "Transitional" frequency for 700MHZ clearance purposes), BBC A from UHF 55 to UHF 48 and Arqiva B from UHF 50 to UHF 33.

16 October 2019 to present

Midhurst completed 700 MHz clearance on 16 October 2019 when the following frequencies came into use.

See also
List of masts
List of tallest structures in the United Kingdom
List of radio stations in the United Kingdom

References

External links
MB21 Transmission Gallery
Digital UK - Midhurst
Ofcom 'Digital Switchover Transmitter Details - Meridian Region'
Midhurst Transmitter at thebigtower.com

Transmitter sites in England